Henry Johnston or Johnstone may refer to:

Henry S. Johnston (1867–1965), American politician and lawyer, 7th Governor of Oklahoma
Henry Johnston (footballer), English soccer player of the 1920s
Henry Johnston (Irish politician) (1908–1991), Irish Fianna Fáil politician from Meath
Henry Johnstone Jr. (1920–2000), American philosopher and rhetorician
Henry Erskine Johnston (1777–1830), Scottish actor
Henry Halcro Johnston (1856–1939), Scottish botanist, physician and rugby union player
Henry Johnston, Lord Johnston (1844–1931), Scottish judge
Henry James Johnstone (1835–1907), portrait photographer in Melbourne, Australia

See also
Henry Butler-Johnstone (1809–1879), British Conservative Party politician
Henry Munro-Butler-Johnstone (1837–1902), British author and Conservative Party politician
Harry Johnston (disambiguation)
Henry Johnson (disambiguation)